Flax Pond may refer to:

Flax Pond (Bourne, Massachusetts) in Nickerson State Park
Flax Pond (Brewster, Massachusetts)
Flax Pond (Lynn, Massachusetts)
Flax Pond (New York), a tidal estuary located in Old Field, New York